In the technology industry, buzzword compliant is a tongue-in-cheek expression used to suggest that a particular product supports features simply because they are currently fashionable. 

Buzzword compliance is a modern version of the old practice of being checkbox compliant, ensuring that a product has all the features listed in product reviews. Since many of the decision-makers regarding technology purchases may only be semi-literate technically, the use of buzzwords makes a product sound more valuable. Among the technically literate, the phrase is sometimes used in a sardonic way, as in: "I have no idea what it does, but it sure is buzzword compliant", implying that perhaps the effort on the product has gone into marketing and public relations rather than the technology.

Technical staff, and those involved in recruiting and hiring them, also speak of a résumé or CV being "buzzword compliant" when it contains a large number of such terms.	This can be a matter of some practical importance to a job-seeker.	In many large organizations, those who receive and evaluate applications for employment will not be familiar with the domain of the job, and therefore can only assess buzzword compliance with the job description when deciding which applications the hiring manager will see.

Examples
Examples include:

 Client–server products in the early 1990s
 CORBA and COM based programs in the mid-1990s
 Java-based programs in the late 1990s
JavaScript, so named and with syntax designed to appeal to the Java marketing hype
 Service-oriented architecture (SOA)
 Ajax or Web 2.0 in 2000s and 2010s
 REST and REST APIs in 2010s
 Cloud computing in 2010s
 The Internet of Things
 NoSQL databases
 Agile software development
 Big Data
 Docker and containers
Blockchain technologies as of 2018
Digital transformation
Ambient intelligence
 Web3
 Metaverse

See also 
 Buzzword bingo
 Golden hammer
 Power word

References

Further reading 
, a comprehensive book addressing the problems of language within the data architecture field.  It addresses both conceptual (business-oriented) and technology modeling.

Computer jargon
Buzzword